Heterogaster artemisiae is a species of seed bug that has been reported as a pest of common thyme in Hungary.

References

Lygaeoidea
Hemiptera of Europe
Insects described in 1829